"Nine in the Afternoon" is a song by the American rock band Panic at the Disco, and the lead single from the group's second album Pretty. Odd.. It was the band's first song release that did not include the exclamation mark at the end of the "Panic" in the group's name. It was the fifth song written for the album.

It was the first song written after the band decided to scrap an entire album of songs that the members had been planning to release in autumn 2007. Panic at the Disco's first performance of "Nine in the Afternoon" was at Virgin Festival 2007. The song has undergone changes in key and lyrics since first being performed. This song was number 44 on Rolling Stones list of the 100 Best Songs of 2008.

On January 28, 2008, at 9:00pm, Panic at the Disco released "Nine in the Afternoon" via the group's MySpace page. Soon after, the band removed the song from that page and added a demo of another song from the new album, "We're So Starving". The following day, Apple added the single for download. The song impacted radio on February 19. As of March, "Nine in the Afternoon" has received moderate radio airplay. It has also been featured in the episode of the NBC television series Heroes titled "Cautionary Tales" and was included in the official television soundtrack album released in early 2008.

The song was covered by The Academy Is..., another Decaydance band, on Warped Tour 2008.

The song is a playable song in the music video game Rock Band 2. It was included on the soundtrack for the video game NHL 09, and was released as downloadable content for the games Just Dance 2 and Lips. It is also on the guitar game Guitar Rock Tour 2.

On the deluxe LP of Pretty. Odd., the song does not have the cymbal hit from the previous track. Instead, it starts with piano.

The song's title comes from an event during a practice session. After playing for a while and not knowing what time it was, Spencer Smith suggested that it was "seven in the afternoon". It was later changed to "nine in the afternoon" to mesh better with the other lyrics.

On the spine of the Australian CD single, the title of the song was misprinted as "Nine in the Morning".

Music video

According to an advertisement, the concept of the video for the song is a "series of bizarre yet fundamentally recognizable events with the band members". The video contains 40 extra and people will be featured as there are different periods, looks, wardrobe and hair changes. In an MTV interview, it is said that in the video "there are gratuitous fake mustaches involved and a rather bizarre parade being led by the members of the band, who are dressed in what could only be described as 'Sgt. Pepper's-meets-ice-fishing' attire (lots of epaulettes and thermal underwear). Each of them also wears a sash printed with the phrase 'Pretty Odd'." Originally, some of the scenes were supposed to be filmed in a "desert wasteland", but in the writing process, the director made a typing error and spelled out "dessert wasteland". The group decided to adapt that idea. The dessert wasteland shows the band in animal masks. The band members also wear black, red and other colored turtleneck sweaters. The turtlenecks covered up the mask necks and made it seem the band actually had animal heads. The video was directed by Shane Drake, who worked on "I Write Sins Not Tragedies" and "But It's Better If You Do".

Many elements of the video relate it to The Beatles. Already mentioned is the Sgt. Pepper attire. The members of the band also each wake up in a different colored room, much like The Beatles had in their movie Help!. The members of the band also wear animal costumes like The Beatles had done for their "I Am the Walrus" video. The sequence where the members run away from a crowd of screaming girls is reminiscent of "A Hard Day's Night".

MTV premiered the music video of "Nine in the Afternoon" on February 10, 2008, at 9:00pm. This date was confirmed earlier during Panic's Final Challenge on MTV's website. The video made its TRL debut the next day.

In July on MTV, it was announced that "Nine in the Afternoon" was nominated for a MTV Video Music Award for Best Pop Video.

Track listings
Digital download single
 "Nine in the Afternoon" (album version or radio mix)

Australian CD single
 "Nine in the Afternoon" (radio mix)
 "Behind the Sea" (alternate version)
 "Do You Know What I'm Seeing?" (alternate version)

UK CD single
 "Nine in the Afternoon" (album version)

UK 7-inch single part 1
 "Nine in the Afternoon" (album version)
 "Do You Know What I'm Seeing?" (alternate version)

UK 7-inch single part 2
 "Nine in the Afternoon" (album version)
 "Behind the Sea" (alternate version)

US 7-inch single
 "Nine in the Afternoon"
 "Pas de Cheval"

US promotional CD-R single
 "Nine in the Afternoon" (radio edit)
 "Nine in the Afternoon" (radio mix)

European promotional CD single
 "Nine in the Afternoon" (radio edit)
 "Nine in the Afternoon" (radio mix)

Japanese promotional CD-R single
 "Nine in the Afternoon" (radio edit)

Chart performance
In its first week of release, "Nine in the Afternoon" was the most added track at modern rock radio. For the chart week of February 16, 2008, the song debuted at number 29 on the Modern Rock Tracks, at number 79 on the Hot 100, at number 58 on the Canadian Hot 100 and at number 24 on the Australian ARIA Singles Chart. The single debuted at number 13 on the UK Singles Chart on downloads alone, becoming the band's highest charting single in that country to date. On July 30, 2008, the song was certified gold by the RIAA.

Charts

Certifications

References

External links
 Official band site
 Nine in the Afternoon Music video
 Nine in the Afternoon (Acoustic) Pimp Music video
 Nine in the Afternoon lyrics on Songmeanings.com
 Review of Nine in the Afternoon on Unreality Music

Panic! at the Disco songs
2008 singles
2008 songs
Fueled by Ramen singles
Music videos directed by Shane Drake
Song recordings produced by Rob Mathes
Songs written by Brendon Urie
Songs written by Jon Walker
Songs written by Ryan Ross
Songs written by Spencer Smith (musician)